Simone Ackermann (born 1 February 1990) is a South African triathlete. She competed in the women's event at the 2020 Summer Olympics.

References

External links
 

1990 births
Living people
South African female triathletes
Olympic triathletes of South Africa
Triathletes at the 2020 Summer Olympics
Sportspeople from East London, Eastern Cape
20th-century South African women
21st-century South African women
Triathletes at the 2022 Commonwealth Games
Commonwealth Games competitors for South Africa